Niles Hollowell-Dhar (born October 6, 1988), better known by his stage name Kshmr (pronounced "Kashmir" and stylized in all caps), is an American DJ, record producer and musician from California.

Studio albums

Extended plays

Singles

As lead artist

As featured artist

Royalty-free songs

Songwriting and production credits

Remixes

References

Discographies of American artists
Electronic music discographies